Peters Butte is a flat-topped, steep-sided rock butte on the south side of McCarthy Valley in Long Hills, Horlick Mountains. Mapped by United States Geological Survey (USGS) from surveys and U.S. Navy aerial photographs, 1958–60. Named by Advisory Committee on Antarctic Names (US-ACAN) for Norman L. Peters, meteorologist at Byrd Station in 1958.

Buttes of Antarctica
Landforms of Marie Byrd Land